MFR Souls is an South  African Amapiano music duo founded in 2012 by Tumelo Nedondwe and Tumelo Mabe, both of whom are DJ and music producers from Katlehong in the East Rand of Johannesburg. Their hit single "Love You Tonight" was commercial success certified platinum in South Africa.

History

2009-2013: Early years 
They both met in 2009 at Tokoza event and  formed their  group in 2013, Ma-Ero & Force Reloaded and later was named MFR Souls. It is said by many that the duo are the pioneers of Amapiano music genre.

2014-2019: The beginning, Bless The Souls, Scorpion Kings
In December 2015, their 5 tracks Extended Play Bless The Souls was released.

On  October 4, 2019, they released a single "Love You Tonight" featuring Sha Sha, Kabza De Small and DJ Maphorisa.
The song was certified platinum in South Africa. At the 26th ceremony of South African Music Awards "Love You Tonight" was nominated for Best Collaboration and Best Music Video. 
Their collaborative album Scorpion Kings with Kabza De Small, Virgo Deep and DJ Maphorisa won Best Produced Album of the Year at SAMA 26 awards. On November 8, 2019, their Extended Play  The beginning was released.

2020-present: Musical Kings, Healers Of The Soul, T-Squared
In early  2020, their single "Amanikiniki" featuring Kamo Mphela and Bontle Smith was released. The song  debuted number 3 on RAM charts and was certified platinum  with sales of 50 000 units. "Amanikiniki" was nominated for Record of the Year (fan-voted) and Music Video of The Year at 27th South African Music Awards and Song Of the Year at MAMA awards. On August 14, 2020, their second studio album Musical Kings was released. The album features Bontle Smith, Tshego, Zano, J’Something and Manu Worldstar.

On May 14, 2021, they released a single "Abahambayo" featuring Mzulu Kakhulu, Khobzn Kiavalla and DJ T-Man SA.

In October 12, they teased their second studio album Healers Of The Soul, released on November 12, 2021. In November 4, album  pre-order were made available.

On April 1, 2022, their EP T-squared was released in South Africa.

In early May 2022, they were featured on Freedom Sounds: From Kwaito to Amapiano documentary by Spotify.

Discography

Extended plays 
 The beginning (2019)
 T-squared (2022)
 Elements of Life (2022)

Studio albums 
 Musical Kings (2020)
 TBA (2023)

References 

Musical groups established in 2013
South African musical duos
Male musical duos
Sony Music Publishing artists
Amapiano musicians